is an arcade game released in 1985 by UPL. It was ported to the original Game Boy (1990), MSX and Famicom by ASCII under the title Penguin Wars. The Game Boy version of the game is known as King of the Zoo in Europe and Penguin-Kun Wars Vs. in Japan. The main background music in most versions of the game is an electronic rendition of  a song originally performed by 1980s J-Pop singer  (in turn a translation of "The Glamorous Life" performed by Sheila E.).

Gameplay 

The player participates in a sport called , a pun on the Japanese pronunciation of "Dodgeball". In the arcade and Famicom editions of the game, the five animals featured are the penguin, bear, panda, koala and beaver, with the penguin being controlled by the player. In the Game Boy version, the player can choose as any one of the five animals, which, in addition to the penguin, are a cow, rabbit, bat, and rat. In all versions of the game, the player plays against all the other animals. In each game, the participating animals find each other on opposite sides of a square table with five balls on each side. The object of the game is to roll those balls over the table. As soon as all ten balls are on one player's side, that player loses the game. Each game also has a time limit of 60 seconds; if that is reached, the player with the fewest balls on their side wins.

If a player is hit by one of the balls, they are knocked unconscious for a certain amount of time. Thus, it could also be said that part of the object of the game is to hit the opponent, as otherwise it would not be possible to get all ten balls to the other side (the opponent can just roll them back before all of them have arrived).

The different animals have different strengths and weaknesses which are a trade-off with each other. For example, the rat is the one that can move left and right the fastest, but in return he can roll the balls only very slowly. The cow, on the other hand, is a very slow walker, but in return she regains consciousness more quickly.

After thirty seconds of playing, a jellybean-like obstacle appears in the middle of the table which moves left and right. Different kinds of these obstacles cause varying effects on the trajectory of the balls; some deflect them so they start rolling diagonally (the players themselves can only roll them parallel to the sides of the table), whereas others simply have the ball bounce straight back.

Reception 
In Japan, Game Machine listed Penguin Wars on their August 1, 1985 issue as being the fourteenth most-successful table arcade unit of the month.

Legacy 
A remake of Penguin Wars was announced for the Nintendo Switch on July 25, 2017. The game was released in Japan on September 21, 2017. The PlayStation 4 and Xbox One versions were announced in November. The Nintendo Switch version was released on June 27, 2019 in North America and Europe.

See also
 Pikiinya!

References

External links

1985 video games
Arcade video games
ASCII Corporation games
Fictional penguins
Game Boy games
FM-7 games
NEC PC-8801 games
Nintendo Entertainment System games
Magical Company games
MSX games
Sharp X1 games
Sharp MZ games
UPL Co., Ltd games
Hamster Corporation franchises
Video games developed in Japan
Nintendo Switch games
PlayStation 4 games
Xbox One games
Video games about birds
Multiplayer and single-player video games
Pax Softnica games